Telecommunications in New Zealand are fairly typical for an industrialised country.

Fixed-line broadband and telephone services are largely provided through copper-based networks, although fibre-based services are increasingly common. Spark New Zealand, Vodafone New Zealand, and 2degrees provide most services, although a number of smaller mobile virtual network operators also exist.

History 

The first telegraph opened in New Zealand between the port of Lyttelton and Christchurch on 16 June 1862. The line was constructed along the Lyttelton - Christchurch railway line. The Vogel Era from 1870 saw a major expansion of the telegraph network, including an inter-island cable. The first overseas telegraph cable between Australia and New Zealand began operation on 21 February 1876.

The Electric Telegraph Department formed to manage the growing telegraph network was merged with Post Office Department to form the New Zealand Post and Telegraph Department in 1881.

Following early experiments with telephones on telegraph lines, the colonial government established a state monopoly in telephony with the Electric Telegraph Act 1875. By 1900 there were 7,150 subscribers to telephone services. Telephony subscriptions grew greatly over the next century, it was estimated by 1965 that 35% of New Zealanders had a telephone.

By the 1980s there was major telephony traffic congestion on the New Zealand Post Office network. In Auckland, the central exchange was overloaded and "verging on collapse" elsewhere in New Zealand users often experienced network overloading and crashes. Some areas still had manual telephone exchanges; Queenstown, for example, wasn't upgraded to automatic service until 1988. The New Zealand Post Office was highly inefficient, being hamstrung as a government department and required to apply to the Treasury for capital investment. As the Post Office was a monopoly, it had no incentive to improve customer service.

The monopoly over telecommunications came to an end in 1987 when Telecom New Zealand was formed, initially as a state-owned enterprise and then privatised in 1990. Competition began in the early 1990s, greatly reducing prices. The first competitor to market was Clear Communications, a consortium of North American and New Zealand businesses. Chorus, which was split from Telecom (now Spark) in 2011, still owns the majority of the telecommunications infrastructure, but competition from other providers has increased. A large-scale rollout of gigabit-capable fibre to the premises, branded as Ultra-Fast Broadband, began in 2009 with a target of being available to 87% of the population by 2022. , the United Nations International Telecommunication Union ranks New Zealand 13th in the development of information and communications infrastructure.

Telephones 

Country calling code: 64
 The same code is also used to reach Scott Base in Antarctica and the United States base McMurdo Station nearby.

Mobile phone system 
 Number of mobile connections: 4.7 million (2010)
 Coverage available to approx 97% of the population.
 Operators:
 2degrees (operating UMTS and LTE)
Virtual network operators: Warehouse Mobile (owned by The Warehouse Group)
 Spark New Zealand (operating UMTS, HSDPA and LTE)
Virtual network operators: Skinny (owned by Spark NZ), Digital Island, Vocus (previously CallPlus) Compass Flexiroam,
 Vodafone New Zealand (operating GSM, UMTS, HSDPA and LTE)
Virtual network operators: Flexiroam, Black+White, M2, Kogan Mobile NZ, MyRepublic

Fixed-line telephone system 
Number of fixed line connections: 1.92 million (2000)
Individual lines available to 99% of residences.
VoIP Cloud Based Voice services are now mainstream.
Traditional Copper line Operators:
Chorus Limited:  A large numbers of ISPs (referred to as "retail service providers") retail Chorus' connections to personal and business customers. As a wholesaler, Chorus does not retail internet connections to end users.

Cable and microwave links 
 Domestic:
 Optical fibre and microwave links between cities
 Submarine optical fibre cables between the North Island and the South Island
 International:
 Submarine cables:
 Hawaiki Cable (launched July 2018)
 Southern Cross Cable (to Australia and Hawaii)
 TASMAN 2 (to Australia)
 Tasman Global Access (to Australia, completed March 2017)
 Moana Cable (proposed)
 Satellite earth stations: 2 Intelsat (Pacific Ocean)

Radio 
Radio broadcast stations: AM 124, FM 290, shortwave 4 (1998), 4 on Freeview digital satellite.
See also: List of radio stations in New Zealand
Radios: 3.75 million (1997)

Television 

Television broadcast stations: 41 (plus 52 medium-power repeaters and over 650 low-power repeaters) (1997)
These transmit 4 nationwide free-to-air networks and a few regional or local single transmitter stations. Analogue was phased out between September 2012 and December 2013
Digital Satellite pay TV is also available and carries most terrestrial networks.
Freeview digital free satellite with a dozen SD channels, with SD feeds of the terrestrial HD freeview channels.
Freeview, free-to-air digital terrestrial HD and SD content.
Cable TV is available in some urban areas with Vodafone's broadband services.
See also: List of New Zealand television channels
Televisions: 1.926 million (1997)

Internet 

Internet Service Providers (ISPs): 36 (2000)
Internet users: 4.55 million (2021) 
Fixed internet connections: 1.24 million (2013)
Country code (Top level domain): .nz

Telecommunications Development Levy

The government charges a $50 million Telecommunications Development Levy annually to fund improvements to communications infrastructure such as the Rural Broadband Initiative. It is payable by telecommunications firms with an operating revenue of over $10 million, in proportion to their qualified revenue.

See also 
 Economy of New Zealand

References

Further reading